The Maria Theresa thaler (MTT) is a silver bullion coin and a type of Conventionsthaler that has been used in world trade continuously since it was first minted in 1741.  It is named after Maria Theresa  who ruled Austria, Hungary, and Bohemia from 1740 to 1780 and is depicted on the coin.

History

In 1751 this new standard Conventionsthaler was effectively adopted across the German-speaking world when it was accepted formally in the Bavarian monetary convention. This new, post-1751 thaler has continued as a trade coin ever since.

Since the death of Maria Theresa in 1780, the coin has always been dated 1780. On 19 September 1857, Emperor Francis Joseph of Austria declared the Maria Theresa thaler to be an official trade coinage. A little over a year later, on 31 October 1858, it lost its status as currency in Austria.

The MTT could also be found throughout the Arab world, especially in Saudi Arabia, Yemen, and Muscat and Oman, in Africa, especially in Ethiopia, and in India. Being of similar size to the Spanish eight-real coin, and initially thought to be of French origin, the MTT acquired the Arab name Alriyal Alfransi, literally the "French Riyal". This coin was therefore the predecessor to, among others, the Saudi Riyal and the Ethiopian birr.

During the Japanese occupation of Indonesia in World War II, enough people preferred it to the money issued by the occupying forces that the American Office of Strategic Services created counterfeit MTTs for use by resistance forces.

In German-speaking countries, following a spelling reform dated 1901 that took effect two years later, "Thaler" is written "Taler" (the spelling of given names like "Theresa" was not affected). Hence 20th-century references to this coin in German and Austrian sources are found under "Maria-Theresien-Taler". The spelling in English-speaking countries was not affected.

The MTT continues to be produced by the Austrian Mint, and is available in both proof and uncirculated conditions.

Details
It has a silver content of .833 and a copper content of .166 of its total millesimal fineness. Note: Rome mint struck MTTs are marginally lighter being produced in finer 835 standard instead of 833 standard silver.

The inscription on the obverse of this coin is in Latin: "M. THERESIA D. G. R. IMP. HU. BO. REG." The Reverse reads "ARCHID. AVST. DUX BURG. CO. TYR. 1780 X". It is an abbreviation of "Maria Theresia, Dei Gratia Romanorum Imperatrix, Hungariae Bohemiaeque Regina, Archidux Austriae, Dux Burgundiae, Comes Tyrolis. 1780 X", which means, "Maria Theresa, by the grace of God, Empress of the Romans, Queen of Hungary and Bohemia, Archduchess of Austria, Duchess of Burgundy, Countess of Tyrol. 1780". The "X" is actually a saltire or Burgundian cross, and was added in 1750 indicating the new debased standard of the thaler. Around the rim of the coin is the motto of her reign: "Justitia et Clementia", meaning "Justice and Clemency".

Minting outside of Austria
The MTT quickly became a standard trade coin and several nations began striking Maria Theresa thalers. The following mints have struck MTTs: Birmingham, Bombay, Brussels, London, Paris, Rome, and Utrecht, in addition to the Habsburg mints in Günzburg, Hall in Tyrol, Karlsburg, Kremnica, Milan, Prague, and Vienna. Between 1751 and 2000, some 389 million were minted. These various mints distinguished their issues by slight differences in the design, with some of these evolving over time. In 1935 Mussolini gained a 25-year concession over production of the MTT. The Italians blocked non-Italian banks and bullion traders from obtaining the coin and so France, Belgium, and the UK started producing the coin so as to support their economic interests in the Red Sea, Persian Gulf, and East Coast of Africa. In 1961 the 25-year concession ended and Austria made diplomatic approaches to the relevant governments requesting they cease production of the coin. The UK was the last government to agree formally to the request in February 1962.

The MTT came to be used as currency in large parts of Africa and Middle East until after World War II. It was common from North Africa to Somalia, Ethiopia, Kenya, and down the coast of Tanzania to Mozambique. Its popularity in the Red Sea region was such that merchants would not accept any other type of currency. The Italian government produced a similar designed coin in the hope of replacing the Maria Theresa thaler, but it never gained acceptance.

The Maria Theresa thaler was also formerly the currency of the Hejaz, Yemen, and the Aden Protectorate, as well as Muscat and Oman on the Arabia peninsula. The coin remains popular in North Africa and the Middle East to this day in its original form: a silver coin with a portrait of the ruler on the front and the Habsburg Double Eagle on the back.

In the United Kingdom, the Maria Theresa thaler bearing the date of 1780 is a "protected coin" for the purposes of Part II of the Forgery and Counterfeiting Act 1981.

Ethiopia

The MTT is first recorded as circulating in Ethiopia from the reign of Emperor Iyasu II of Ethiopia (1730–1755). According to traveller James Bruce, the coin, not debased as other currencies, dominated the areas he visited in 1768. Joseph Kalmer and Ludwig Hyun in the book Abessinien estimate that over 20% of 245 million coins minted until 1931 ended up in Ethiopia. In 1868, the British military expedition to Magdala, the capital of Emperor Tewodros II of Ethiopia, under Field Marshal Robert Napier, took MTTs with them to pay local expenses. In 1890 the Italians introduced the Tallero Eritreo, styled after the MTT, in their new colony Eritrea, also hoping to impose it on the commerce with Ethiopia. They remained, however, largely unsuccessful. In the early 1900s Menelik II unsuccessfully attempted to mint Menelik thalers locally, with his effigy, but styled following the model of the MTT, and force their use. The newly established Bank of Abyssinia also issued banknotes denominated in thalers. Starting in 1935 the Italians minted the MTT at the mint in Rome for use in their conquest of Ethiopia. Then during World War II, the British minted some 18 million MTTs in Bombay to use in their campaign to drive the Italians out of Ethiopia.

Citations

Further reading

External links

 The Maria Theresia Taler 1780 – Provides information including history, description of variants, strike dates, valuation list, medals, and forgeries.
 Austrian Mint – The place where the coin is minted to this day.

Silver coins
Currencies of Austria
Maria Theresa